A list of tallest structures in Switzerland. This list may be incomplete and incorrect.

 indicates a structure that is no longer standing.

See also
 List of tallest dams in Switzerland
 List of tallest buildings

External links
 SkyscraperPage Comparative diagram of tallest Swiss structures

References

Switzerland
Tallest structures